Torkel is a Nordic masculine given name that may refer to
Torkel Andreas Trønnes (born 1925), Norwegian automobile advocate
Torkel Franzén (1950–2006), Swedish academic
Torkel Halvorsen Aschehoug (1822–1909), Norwegian philosopher of law, economist and politician
Torkel Klingberg, Swedish neuroscientist
Torkel Knutsson (?–1306), Swedish constable and privy council 
Torkel Lende (1849–1909), Norwegian inventor 
Torkel Lillefosse (1868–1946), Norwegian botanist 
Torkel Opsahl (1931–1993), Norwegian human rights scholar
Torkel Opsahl Academic EPublisher
Torkel Persson (1894–1972), Swedish cross country skier 
Torkel Petersson (born 1969), Swedish actor
Torkel Ravndal (1936–2004), Norwegian weightlifter and powerlifter 
Torkel S. Wächter, German-Swedish novelist and airline captain
Torkel Weis-Fogh (1922–1975), Danish zoologist 
Torkel Wetterhus (born 1944), Norwegian businessperson and politician